Free Agents is a loosely knit group of "rap comrades" who came together to make a statement about independence and ownership in a turbulent time in the music industry.  The group consists of Jay Tee, B-12 & Young Dru and their first album Negotiations was released in 2002.  The album was advertised as having "No Features, No Fillers." This can be seen as a departure of the norm by avoiding an album cluttered with guest appearances and over-priced producers.

Track listing 
"What You Been Lookin' For"
"Streets Got No Heart" (featuring Miami)
"Knock A Hoe"
"The Phone Call" (Jaime Trago n His Hutch)
"All Thru Yo' Town" (featuring Miami)
"Can't Fuck With Us"
"Do You Know" (featuring Andre Rivers)
"Problem Solver" (B-12)
"I Been Hustlin'" (featuring Weet Dog)
"Custom Tint" (Young Dru)
"Weight On My Shoulders" (featuring Weet Dog)
"If A Bitch Is Broke" (featuring Miami)

References

External links
 [ Negotiations] at Allmusic

Jay Tee albums
2002 debut albums
West Coast hip hop albums